Eresus solitarius is a spider species in the family Eresidae. It is found in the Mediterranean Basin.

References

Eresidae
Spiders of Europe
Spiders described in 1873
Taxa named by Eugène Simon